Réka Dabasi (born 24 December 1996) is a Hungarian ice hockey player and member of the Hungarian national ice hockey team, currently signed with the Metropolitan Riveters of the Premier Hockey Federation (PHF; called NWHL until 2021). In July 2021, she was selected second overall by the Toronto Six in the inaugural NWHL International Draft and, in May 2022, she became the first Hungarian player to sign with a PHF team after signing a contract with the Metropolitan Riveters for the 2022–23 season.

Playing career

Dabasi has represented Hungary at ten IIHF World Women's Championships – twice at the Division II A level, three times at the Division I B level, three times at the Division I A level, and at the Top Division tournaments in 2021 and 2022.

With the Hungarian national under-18 team, Dabasi participated in the IIHF Women's U18 World Championships in 2013 and 2014.

Career statistics

International

Source(s):

References

External links 
 

Living people
1996 births
Expatriate ice hockey players in the United States
Hungarian expatriate sportspeople in the United States
Hungarian women's ice hockey forwards
Ice hockey people from Budapest
KMH Budapest (women) players
Metropolitan Riveters players
20th-century Hungarian women
21st-century Hungarian women